Paices Wood Country Parkland is a country park on the edge of the village of Aldermaston in Berkshire, England. The parkland is under the management of the Berkshire, Buckinghamshire and Oxfordshire Wildlife Trust.

Geography and site

The parkland consists of woodland, grassland and several lakes located in a narrow valley. A medieval road borders the site to the north-west edge, creating a natural boundary with the neighbouring Wasing Estate.

There are seven lakes which vary in size from 0.4 acres up to 3.3 acres.

History

Young Estates & Land Ltd bought what is now Youngs Industrial Estate and Paices Wood Country Parkland in 1961 from Turner & Hunter, a timber company. The land was purchased for the purpose of gravel extraction, with the lakes that are now on the site created for washing the gravel.

When gravel extraction finished in the early 1980s, the land was restored and became the site of the industrial estate and the rest of the site was developed into country parkland.

In 2014 the management of the parkland was transferred from West Berkshire Council to the Berkshire, Buckinghamshire and Oxfordshire Wildlife Trust.

Fauna

The site has the following fauna:

Reptiles and amphibians

 Grass snake
 Slowworm
 Common frog
 Palmate newt
 Viviparous lizard

Invertebrates

 Grayling
 Purple emperor
 Common blue
 White admiral
 Silver-washed fritillary
 European peacock
 Drab looper
 Grizzled skipper
 Brimstones
 Comma
 Dingy skipper
 Small heath
 Treble-bar
 Lesser treble-bar

Birds

 Woodlark
 Northern lapwing
 Lesser spotted woodpecker
 Marsh tit

Fish

 Mirror carp
 Common carp
 Crucian carp
 European perch
 Common roach
 Northern pike
 Common rudd
 Tench

Flora

The site has the following flora:

Trees

 Betula pubescens
 Castanea sativa
 Hazel
 Fraxinus excelsior
 Quercus robur
 Alder
 Prunus avium

Plants

 Hyacinthoides non-scripta
 Euphorbia amygdaloides
 Erica tetralix
 Erica cinerea

Fungi

 Laetiporus

References

Parks and open spaces in Berkshire
West Berkshire District
Berkshire, Buckinghamshire and Oxfordshire Wildlife Trust